Two Royal Navy ships have been named Foudroyant, the name derived from the French, meaning Thunderbolt. A third was planned but later renamed:

 was an 80-gun third rate, captured from the French in 1758 and broken up in 1787.
 was an 80-gun third-rate ship of the line, launched in 1798. She was used as a guardship from 1820, and a training ship from 1862. She was sold in 1892 and used as a school ship until being wrecked in 1897.
HMS Foudroyant was to have been a battleship. She was renamed  shortly before her launch in 1909.

See also
  was renamed Foudroyant in 1897 whilst serving as a replacement for the wrecked schoolship.  She was renamed Trincomalee in 1991 and is currently preserved as a museum ship.
 , originally the French ship Duguay-Trouin, was renamed Foudroyant in 1943 before being scuttled in 1949.
 

Royal Navy ship names